Arzuiyeh Rural District is a rural district (dehestan) in the Central District of Arzuiyeh County, Kerman Province, Iran. At the 2006 census, its population was 13,656, in 3,153 families. The rural district has 103 villages.

References 

Rural Districts of Kerman Province
Baft County